N'Zécrézessou is a town in east-central Ivory Coast. It is a sub-prefecture of Bocanda Department in N'Zi Region, Lacs District.

N'Zécrézessou was a commune until March 2012, when it became one of 1126 communes nationwide that were abolished.

In 2014, the population of the sub-prefecture of N'Zécrézessou was 26,549.

Villages
The 10 villages of the sub-prefecture of N'Zécrézessou and their population in 2014 are:

References

Sub-prefectures of N'Zi Region
Former communes of Ivory Coast